The 2013 Eastleigh by-election was a parliamentary by-election held on 28 February 2013 for the United Kingdom House of Commons constituency of Eastleigh in Hampshire.

The election was triggered by the resignation of the sitting MP, Liberal Democrat Chris Huhne, which took effect on 5 February 2013. The resignation coincided with his guilty plea on the eve of a court case in which he and his ex-wife were to be prosecuted for lying to police about a historical speeding offence (committed in 2003 but which only came to light in May 2011). Huhne had already stood down from his position as the Secretary of State for Energy and Climate Change in February 2012 when first charged.

Mike Thornton retained the seat for the Liberal Democrats, though with a reduced majority compared with the 2010 general election. UKIP came second with a greatly increased share of the vote, the Conservatives came third, and Labour fourth. Following the election result, UKIP leader Nigel Farage and Conservative candidate Maria Hutchings each blamed the other party for splitting the vote and allowing the Liberal Democrats to win.

Selection of candidates
The Statement of Persons Nominated was published on 13 February and confirmed 14 candidates for the by-election.
The defending party, the Liberal Democrats, nominated Eastleigh Borough Council councillor Mike Thornton.

Maria Hutchings, the Conservatives' candidate at the General Election, was chosen as the candidate for the by-election on 7 February. Hutchings came to prominence in 2005 when she interrupted a live television phone-in with the then Prime Minister Tony Blair. She said that she would vote for Britain to leave the EU and would have voted against gay marriage. She also identified as pro-life and says that she is not a "Tory toff".

The Labour Party chose author and broadcaster John O'Farrell as its candidate on 12 February. Having received during the campaign negative coverage of selected quotations from a book he wrote in 1998, in which he recalled the Brighton bomb attacks against the Conservative Party and then Prime Minister Margaret Thatcher, O'Farrell reflected after polling day that the experience was enough to put him off electoral politics for good.

UKIP Eastleigh selected candidate Diane James, a Councillor from Ewhurst in Waverley, Surrey, who was elected there as an independent and subsequently joined UKIP. The party's leader, Nigel Farage, previously contested the seat at a by-election in 1994. While he initially said he would consider standing again, he decided not to after much media speculation.

The English Democrats fielded Michael Walters, the South East Area Secretary of the party.

The Christian Party candidate was Kevin Milburn. He said "I am standing in this election to allow voters the opportunity to show their disapproval of this Government over many issues, including their attack on marriage. The Government has upset vast swathes of the population with this ill-conceived Bill."

The Monster Raving Loony Party, which stood in the 1994 by-election, selected its leader Howling Laud Hope as its candidate.

On 8 February, the Trade Unionist and Socialist Coalition announced that it had chosen Darren Procter, secretary of the Southampton Shipping branch of the RMT union, as their candidate. Procter also serves on the National Executive Committee of RMT. He stood on an anti-austerity platform.

The National Health Action Party, a new party founded in 2012 in response to the Coalition Government's healthcare reforms, selected Dr Iain Maclennan, a local doctor and former Royal Navy medical officer, as their candidate.

Independent candidate Danny Stupple stood in protest at gay marriage and what he describes as the party "machine" pushing it through Parliament.

The Wessex Regionalist Party fielded the party's president, Colin Bex, as its candidate.

Polling

Result
The Liberal Democrats' win was their first in a by-election since Dunfermline and West Fife seven years earlier. It was also their first by-election win under the leadership of Nick Clegg. The UKIP vote was their highest yet in any parliamentary election (in both share and number of votes), and was the fourth time the party had come second in a by-election. At the time, it was also the closest UKIP had come to winning a Westminster seat.

With less than 7% of the vote separating the top three candidates, it was the closest three-way result in an English by-election for over 90 years (in Penistone in 1921 there was 6% between the top three). It was also the first time since the 1989 Richmond by-election that Labour had come fourth while in opposition.

See also
1994 Eastleigh by-election
List of United Kingdom by-elections (2010–present)
Opinion polling for the 2015 United Kingdom general election
Opinion polling in United Kingdom constituencies (2010–2015)

References

External links

Politics of the Borough of Eastleigh
By-elections to the Parliament of the United Kingdom in Hampshire constituencies
Eastleigh by-election
Eastleigh by-election
2010s in Hampshire
Eastleigh by-election